Rhinestone is the soundtrack album from the 1984 film of the same name starring Dolly Parton and Sylvester Stallone. It was released on June 18, 1984, by RCA Victor. The album was produced  by Mike Post and Parton. It peaked at number 22 on the Billboard Top Country Albums chart and number 135 on the Billboard 200. The Dolly Parton-composed soundtrack produced two top ten singles on the Billboard Hot Country Songs chart: "Tennessee Homesick Blues" and "God Won't Get You", which peaked at numbers one and ten, respectively.

Background
Parton stated in her 1994 autobiography, My Life and Other Unfinished Business, that she regards the soundtrack album as some of the best work she's done, though the film was largely regarded as a critical and commercial flop. She also cites "What a Heartache" as a personal favorite of all the songs she has written. She has since re-recorded twice. The first time was on the 1991 album Eagle When She Flies and again on the 2002 album Halos & Horns.

Release and promotion
The album was released June 18, 1984 on CD, cassette, 8-track, and LP.

Singles
"Tennessee Homesick Blues" was released as the album's first single in May 1984. It peaked at number one on both the Billboard Hot Country Songs chart and the Canadian RPM Country Singles chart.

"God Won't Get You", was released in August 1984 and peaked at number 10 on the Billboard Hot Country Songs chart and number eight on the Canadian RPM Country Singles chart.

"Goin' Back to Heaven" was released in October 1984 as the fourth single and it did not chart.

"What a Heartache" was released as a single in the Netherlands in 1984 and did not chart.

Commercial performance
The album debuted at number 54 on the Billboard Top Country Albums chart dated July 28, 1984. It peaked at number 32 on the chart dated September 8, its seventh week on the chart. The album charted for a total of 17 weeks. It also peaked at number 135 on the Billboard 200.

Reissues
Rhinestone was released digitally for the first time on December 4, 2015.

Track listing

Personnel
Adapted from the album liner notes.

Performance
Mike Baird – drums
Dennis Belfield – bass
John Bidasio – steel guitar
Rusty Buchanan – lead vocals
Richard Dennison – background vocals
Linda Dillard – background vocals
John Goux – guitars
David Lindley – fiddle
Tommy Morgan – harmonica
Larry Muhoberac – piano
Willie Ornelas – drums
Dolly Parton – lead vocals
Floyd Parton – lead vocals
Randy Parton – lead vocals, background vocals
Stella Parton – lead vocals
Herb Pedersen – guitars, banjo, background vocals
Pete Robinson – synthesizers
Joey Scarbury – background vocals
Leland Sklar – bass
Sylvester Stallone – lead vocals
Ian Underwood – synthesizers
Kim Vassy – lead vocals
Steve Watson – guitars

Production
Dolly Parton – producer
Doug Parry – recording, mixing
Mike Post – producer, arrangements
Ray Sheibley – second engineer

Other personnel
Tim Bryant – art direction, art design
Steve Shapiro – photography

Charts

Notes

References
 Parton, Dolly, 1994. My Life and Other Unfinished Business. HarperCollins Press, New York.

External links
 Rhinestone Soundtrack at Dolly Parton On-Line

1984 soundtrack albums
1980s film soundtrack albums
Dolly Parton soundtracks
RCA Records soundtracks